Biggerstaff is a surname. Notable people with the surname include:

Knight Biggerstaff (1906–2001), American historian
Sean Biggerstaff (born 1983), Scottish actor and musician

See also
 Bickerstaff